The Joint List (al-Qa'imah al-Mushtarakah, HaReshima HaMeshutefet) was a political alliance of four of the Arab-majority political parties in Israel: Hadash, Balad, Ra'am and Ta'al. Ra'am left the alliance on 28 January 2021. With Balad wanting to leave the coalition, it was subsequently dissolved in 2022.

The alliance was the third-largest faction in the Knesset after the 2015 election, estimated to have received 82% of the Arab vote. In January 2019, Ta'al split from the alliance, and the remaining coalition was dissolved on 21 February 2019. The Joint List was reestablished on 28 July for the September 2019 election, in which it was again the third-largest faction. In the 2020 elections, the Joint List increased its seats from 13 to 15, described by Haaretz as "an unprecedented showing". In the buildup to the 2021 elections, the Islamic conservative-leaning United Arab List or Ra'am left the Joint List due to ideological disagreements and ran on its own, gaining four seats, while the seats held by the Joint List fell to six.

History

The Joint List was formed in the build-up to the 2015 elections as an alliance of Balad, Hadash, Ta'al, and the United Arab List (the southern branch of the Islamic Movement). The northern branch of the Islamic Movement denounced the entire electoral project. When formed, the alliance was temporarily known as Wamab.

The agreement between the parties was signed on 22 January, marking the first time the major Arab parties had run as a single list. Balad, Hadash, and the United Arab List had run separately for elections since the 1990s (Balad and Hadash ran together in 1996), whilst Ta'al had run in alliance with all three during the 1990s and 2000s. However, the raising of the electoral threshold from 2% to 3.25% led to the parties creating an alliance to increase their chances of crossing the threshold, as both Hadash and Balad received less than 3% of the vote in the 2013 elections. Initially, the parties mulled running as two blocs (Hadash with Ta'al, and Balad with the Islamic Movement), but party representatives said pressure from the Arab public pushed them to join forces.

The alliance's list for the 2015 elections was headed by Ayman Odeh, the newly-elected leader of Hadash, followed by Masud Ghnaim (United Arab List), Jamal Zahalka (Balad), and Ahmad Tibi (Ta'al), with the following places alternating between Hadash, the Islamic Movement, and Balad. The 12th to 14th places were subject to rotation agreements between the parties.

Before the April 2019 election, Ta'al left the alliance, which led to the formation of two lists, Balad-Ra'am and Hadash-Ta'al.

On 22 September 2019, following the September 2019 election, Odeh and the Joint List endorsed Benny Gantz for prime minister, the first time that an Arab party endorsed anyone for prime minister since Yitzhak Rabin in 1992. However, Israeli President Reuven Rivlin announced on 23 September that the Joint List's three Balad MKs had abstained from endorsing a candidate, thus putting Gantz behind incumbent Prime Minister Benjamin Netanyahu in total MK recommendations, though the Joint List's endorsement of Gantz did account for 10 of the political bloc's 13 MKs. After the 2020 election, the Joint List  unanimously supported Gantz. However, after the formation of a unity government, it remained in the opposition.

After new elections were pending, tensions arose in the alliance, whereupon Ra'am and Ta'al left the joint list (the latter rejoined this shortly afterwards). During the election campaign and after party lists had been submitted, the Ma'an party withdrew its candidacy and endorsed the Joint List, becoming a new member of the alliance.

Politics and ideology
The list was ideologically diverse, and included communists, socialists, feminists, Islamists, and Arab nationalists. After having united parties with various political agendas, Odeh met with Jewish Hadash activists and former Knesset speaker Avraham Burg (who had endorsed Hadash), in an attempt to allay concerns that the new alliance would dilute the party's principles, such as gender equality.

The alliance's 2015 election campaign focused on preventing Benjamin Netanyahu from forming a government and helping the Labor Party–led Zionist Union do so instead.

The Joint List was not united in terms of support for Jewish–Arab co-operation, supported mainly by Hadash. In March 2015 (after the Zionist Union had signed a vote-sharing agreement with Meretz, and Kulanu with Israel Beytenu), officials from the Zionist Union, Meretz, and Yesh Atid explored the idea that the Zionist Union and Meretz revoke their agreement so that the Zionist Union could share surplus votes with Yesh Atid, and Meretz with the Joint List, to potentially strengthen the dovish bloc in the Knesset. However, the offer caused intra-list tension; Hadash (including Dov Khenin and Joint List chief Odeh) and the United Arab List supported the partnership with Meretz, but the Islamic Movement and especially Balad opposed it. According to Nahum Barnea, most of the List, including Jamal Zahalka of Balad, supported the agreement, but Qatar, which reportedly funds Balad, sided with the extremist elements within Balad and had the party come out against it. After the Joint List announced it would not share votes with any party, Meretz officials declared that the List had chosen nationalism and separatism over Jewish–Arab solidarity. A post-election analysis showed that no agreement between these left-of-center parties would have made a difference to the final result.

2015 elections

The Joint List won 13 seats in the 2015 Knesset elections with 10.6% of the total vote, becoming the third-largest party in the 20th Knesset. Odeh stated that he intended for the alliance to work on shared issues with center-left Jewish opposition parties and seek membership of key parliamentary committees.

One of the party's first actions after the elections was to trade the two seats that, as the third-largest faction, it was entitled to on the Foreign Affairs and Defense Committee for two more seats on the Finance Committee, primarily to better address its constituents' financial and housing concerns.

2020 elections

The Joint List won 15 seats with 12.67% of the vote in the 2020 Knesset elections, remaining as the third-largest party in the Knesset until Yesh Atid split off from Blue and White to lead the opposition. This set a new record for percentage of the vote and number of seats for an Arab party. This was in part due to an increase in support from the Jewish left, as Ayman Odeh's campaigning in Jewish areas helped draw those voters away from the declining establishment left-wing parties.

2021 elections 

The Joint List ran in the 2021 Knesset election without the United Arab List (Ra'am), who had withdrawn from it several months prior to the vote; it won 4,81% of votes and six seats, a sharp decline compared to previous elections. Such decline was mainly due to the fact that Ra'am ran separately from the List and to the partial resurgence of the Jewish left (Israeli Labor Party and Meretz), who increased their votes and seats. 

The Joint List refused to condemn the 2022 Russian invasion of Ukraine and even refused to attend the speech of Ukrainian President Volodymyr Zelenskyy at the Knesset. This position was harshly criticized by Israeli political scientist Dahlia Scheindlin, who dismissed such position as "shameful".

Leaders

Election results

Notes

References

External links

Official website  (Archive)
Official website 

Political party alliances in Israel
Arab political parties in Israel
Political parties established in 2015
Political parties disestablished in 2022
2015 establishments in Israel
Nazareth
2022 disestablishments in Israel